Tuomas Vänttinen (born 29 July 1983) is a Finnish professional ice hockey player, currently playing for Vaasan Sport of the Finnish Liiga.

References

External links

Living people
HPK players
1983 births
Finnish ice hockey centres
SaiPa players
JYP Jyväskylä players
Tappara players
Vaasan Sport players
People from Savonlinna
Sportspeople from South Savo